Dietmar Haaf (born 6 March 1967 in Bad Cannstatt) is a former (West) German long jumper.

Career
He won the gold medal at the 1990 European Championships in Split in a personal best jump of 8.25 metres. The following year he won the gold medal at the World Indoor Championships in Seville. He finished fourth at the 1991 World Championships in Athletics in Tokyo.

His personal best jump of 8.25 metres ranks him seventh among German long jumpers, behind Lutz Dombrowski, Frank Paschek, Josef Schwarz, Henry Lauterbach, Marco Delonge and Konstantin Krause.

Haaf retired in 1997.

International competitions

Note: Results with a Q, indicate overall position in qualifying round.

References

External links
 
 
 
 Profile at maik-richter.de

1967 births
Living people
German male long jumpers
Athletes (track and field) at the 1992 Summer Olympics
Olympic athletes of Germany
European Athletics Championships medalists
World Athletics Indoor Championships medalists
World Athletics Indoor Championships winners
World Athletics U20 Championships winners
Sportspeople from Stuttgart